There is a long history of Jewish conversion to Catholicism, both voluntarily and forced conversion. What follows is a partial history of some of the well known forced conversions.

Forced conversions

Middle Ages 
Forced conversions of Jews were carried out with support of rulers during Late Antiquity and the early Middle Ages in Gaul, the Iberian peninsula and in the Byzantine empire.

Royal persecutions of Jews from the late eleventh century onward generally took form of expulsions, with some exceptions, such as conversions of Jews in southern Italy of the 13th century, which were carried out by Dominican Inquisitors but instigated by King Charles II of Naples.

Jews were forced to convert to Catholicism before and during the First Crusade by the Crusaders in Lorraine, on the Lower Rhine, in Bavaria and Bohemia, in Mainz and in Worms.

Early modern Iberian peninsula 

Over a hundred thousand of Spain's Jews converted to Catholicism as a result of pogroms in 1391.  Those remaining practicing Jews were expelled by the Catholic monarchs Ferdinand and Isabella in the Alhambra Decree in 1492, following the Catholic Reconquest of Spain. As a result of the Alhambra Decree and persecution in prior years, over 200,000 Jews converted to Catholicism and between 40,000 and 100,000 were expelled.

Meanwhile, in Portugal, although an order for their expulsion was given in 1496, only a handful were allowed to leave, the rest being forced to convert.

Eastern Europe 
Between 1648 and 1649, a large-scale uprising of Cossacks and Ukrainian peasants led by Bohdan Khmelnytsky swept through the Polish–Lithuanian Commonwealth, the area of today's Ukraine. In the course of the fighting, there were many Jewish casualties, and many Jewish communities were destroyed. A large number also converted to Eastern Orthodoxy.

In the 18th century, Elizabeth of Russia launched a campaign of forced conversion of Russia's non-Orthodox subjects, including Muslims and Jews.

Also, in the second half of the 18th century, a mass conversion to Catholicism occurred by followers of Jacob Frank.

Post-Enlightenment 
Although forced conversions were less common in the 20th century, missionary activity remained strong, and many Jews chose to convert in order to integrate into secular society. A critical period in Britain followed when many of the chief Sephardic families — including the Bernals, Furtados, Ricardos, Disraelis (most prominently, Benjamin Disraeli twice prime minister of the United Kingdom), Ximenes, Lopezs and Uzziellis joined the church.

Germany had three main periods of conversion, the first beginning with the Mendelssohnian era (see the Haskalah, the Jewish Enlightenment) and a second wave occurred during the first half of the 19th century. A list of 32 Jewish families and 18 unmarried Jews who had recently converted was given by David Friedlander to Prussian State Chancellor Hardenberg in 1811. In the eight old Prussian provinces between the years of 1816–43, during the reign of Frederick William III., 3,984 Jews were baptized, among them the many of richest and most cultured (2,200 from 1822 to 1840, according to the Jewish Encyclopedia). The third and longest period of secession was due to antisemitism, and began in the year 1880. Across the German states, with the exception of Austria and France, many Jews obtained high stations and large revenues in return for their renouncing Judaism.

In Russia, 40,000 are believed to have been converted between 1836 and 1875. while in Britain during that period, the number has been estimated at 50,000.

Various estimates have been put forward as to the total number of conversions during the 19th century. One Catholic encyclopedia writes that the number exceeded 100,000; while the Jewish Encyclopedia records approximately 190,000. Other contemporary sources put the number at 130,000 or even as many as 250,000.

As a result of the high rate of conversion, many Catholics can be found with a measure of Jewish parentage. In 1930s Germany, Nazi officials discovered that the German Catholic population with some level of Jewish ancestry almost equalled that of the Jewish community of just over five hundred thousand. Today, according to 2013 data from the Pew Research Center, about 1.6 million adult American Jews identify themselves as Christians, most of them Protestant. Of those, most were raised as Jews or are Jews by ancestry. According to a 2012 study 17% of Jews in Russia identify themselves as Christians.

References 

Christianization
Forced religious conversion